Chen Yufei (born 1 March 1998) is a Chinese badminton player. She is the reigning Olympic champion. She won the girls' singles junior titles at the 2016 Asian and the World Junior Championships. At the same year, Chen clinched her first senior title at the Macau Open. She was awarded as the 2017 Eddy Choong Most Promising Player of the Year. On 17 December 2019, she reached a career-high BWF World Ranking as world number 1.

Career

2014–2016 
Chen Yufei started playing in international level from the year 2013, being aged only 15. In 2014, she won the silver medal in the Asian Junior Championships after being beaten by Akane Yamaguchi in the final. She finished runner-up in the German Junior International event after being beaten by Qin Jinjing in the final. In 2015, she reached the finals of the China International but lost to Nozomi Okuhara. Her first Grand Prix Gold final was at the 2015 Indonesia Masters, in which she reached the final after astounding several seeded players, but lost to her teammate He Bingjiao. In 2016, she won the major junior titles, including the Asian Junior Championships after beating Gregoria Mariska Tunjung in a summit clash, and the BWF World Junior Championships by beating Pornpawee Chochuwong in the final. She also won the 2016 Macau Open Grand Prix Gold in the end of the year by defeating Chen Xiaoxin.

2017
She reached the final of the 2017 Swiss Open Grand Prix Gold and had to settle for second best after losing to the same opponent whom she defeated in Macau Open final in 2016, Chen Xiaoxin. In the 2017 BWF World Championships, the 19-year-old Chen participated as the 9th seed in the tournament. After defeating Pai Yu-po, the lower ranked Chinese Taipei's player in the first round, she set her meeting with the top seeded Akane Yamaguchi. She bulldozed her way through with the 21–18, 21–19 victory and stunned the world. This was not over yet, in the quarter-final, she defeated another higher seeded player, the former world champion Ratchanok Intanon in 3 games & assured herself of first ever medal in this elite event. However, in the semifinal, she lost to P. V. Sindhu and had to satisfy herself with the bronze medal. With her strong performances, she got a ticket to contest in the year-ending 2017 BWF Super Series Finals. In the group stage, she lost to Tai Tzu-ying (1–2) but won against Sung Ji-hyun (2–0) & Ratchanok Intanon (2–1) which meant she could confirm her place in the semifinal. But again, in the semi-finals, she lost to P. V. Sindhu in straight games.

2018 
She contested in the 2018 German Open final but lost to Akane Yamaguchi. She won the silver medal at the 2018 Badminton Asia Championships losing to Tai Tzu-ying in straight games. She fell to her 9th consecutive defeat against Tai Tzu-ying in the final of the Indonesia Open, in which she took the opening game but \wasn't sufficient to beat Tai and lost the next two. In the World Championships, she failed to cross the quarter-final after being downed by Akane Yamaguchi, a player Chen defeated last year in straight games. Akane Yamaguchi again proved difficult for Chen to crack, this time at the Asian games where she lost to her in quarter-finals. In her second Super 1000 final at the China Open, which is the highest level of World tour events in badminton, she lost to the reigning world champion, Carolina Marín, in straight games. At the 2018 Fuzhou China Open, a Super 750 event, she finally broke her jinx of losing in the finals after defeating Nozomi Okuhara tamely with 21–10, 21–16, and thus winning her first ever World tour title. She again qualified for taking part in the season-ending championships, this time renamed as the "World Tour Finals", which was held in her home country China. In the 1st match of the group stage against Ratchanok Intanon, she injured herself in the deciding game and lost the match. She wasn't recovered from that yet but she played the 2nd match against the Canadian Michelle Li & again lost. In the final group match, she twisted her ankle in the very early stage of 1st game which forced her to retire and her overall campaign ended.

2019 
2019 proved the best ever year in Chen Yufei's career as she earned multiple titles and honour of becoming the most dominant player of 2019 in her category. Starting with the 2019 All England Open, she defeated Tai Tzu-ying in the final, a player she struggled to beat in her last 11 encounters. Chen finally broke that jinx and won her first super 1000 title. After that, she won the Swiss Open title following her win against Saena Kawakami in the final clash. She competed in the 2019 Badminton Asia Championships as a top seed after defending champion Tai withdrew from the tournament. She made her way to the semifinal and was discomfited by Akane Yamaguchi (1–2), thus claiming the bronze medal. In the 2019 Sudirman Cup, she helped her team to win the record-breaking 11th title, in which she scored a point by defeating Akane Yamaguchi, and eventually Japan was crushed in the final with 3–0 tally by China. Her best form wasn't dipped yet, as she claimed the next title in the Australian Open by totally outplaying Nozomi Okuhara in the final with a very one-sided scoreline 21–15, 21–3. She claimed the Thailand Open title victory by winning against Ratchanok Intanon.

With all her success in 1st half of the year, she was considered as China's best contender for gold in 2019 BWF World Championships in her category. She started well, winning against Pornpawee Chochuwong in round 1, Michelle Li in 2nd round in 3 games. In the quarter-final, she was tested severely by Danish Mia Blichfeldt who once appeared to create an upset by leading 15–12 against her in the decider, but Chen's persistence led her way to the victory and assured her of second medal in this Grade 1 event. In the semifinal her opponent was P. V. Sindhu who had outplayed her in the 2017 World Championships. Chen again proved low against Sindhu in World Championships and was defeated with a big margin 7–21, 14–21. Thus, she again settled for a bronze medal. Leaving her disappointments, she returned very strong and again won series of titles. She won the 2019 Fuzhou China Open again, by beating the same opponent from the last year, Nozomi Okuhara, but this time with tougher opposition. After beating Ratchanok Intanon in the final, she won her 6th World tour title by winning the Hong Kong open. Going into the 2019 BWF World Tour Finals as the best title winning contender, in the group stage, she downed all her opponents P. V. Sindhu (2–1), Akane Yamaguchi (2–0) and He Bingjiao (2–0) to reach the semifinal. She was drawn with Yamaguchi yet again and she displayed a very dominant performance to reach the final. In the final, she showed a great fighting spirit to beat Tai Tzu-ying after being a game down & won the title 12–21, 21–12, 21–17. With her emphatic 7 titles in the year, she became another player from China to become World no. 1 player, as the last time China had the World's top player in Women's singles was in 2015 (Li Xuerui).

2020–2021 
Reaching the final yet again, this time at the 2020 Malaysia Masters, she maintained her unbeaten record at the finals since 2018 Fuzhou China Open, and outgunned Tai Tzu-ying for the title in straight games. She reached her second consecutive 2020 All England Open final and faced opposition from the same rival of last year, Tai Tzu-ying. This time she suffered defeat, and was dethroned from the World no. 1 position.

Chen competed at the 2020 Summer Olympics as the number one seed in the women's singles. In the final, she beat Tai Tzu-ying in an extremely intense match 21–18, 19–21, 21–18 to win the gold medal. In October, she helped the Chinese national team to retain the Sudirman Cup.

2022 
Chen won the Indonesia Masters in June, defeating Ratchanok Intanon in the final in three games. However, she lost seven finals during this season, including a World Championship loss to Akane Yamaguchi during her career's first final in that event, and three losses to her compatriot He Bingjiao. However, due to her seven final appearances in the World Tour, she qualified for the World Tour Finals as the first seed. Although she suffered a surprise loss against Gregoria Mariska Tunjung, she beat Akane Yamaguchi after 5 straight losses and An Se-young to top the group. However, she could not replicate her group stage performance in the semi-finals, as she lost to Akane Yamaguchi in straight games.

Achievements

Olympic Games 
Women's singles

BWF World Championships 
Women's singles

Asian Championships 
Women's singles

BWF World Junior Championships 
Girls' singles

Asian Youth Games 
Mixed doubles

Asian Junior Championships 
Girls' singles

BWF World Tour (10 titles, 11 runners-up) 
The BWF World Tour, which was announced on 19 March 2017 and implemented in 2018, is a series of elite badminton tournaments sanctioned by the Badminton World Federation (BWF). The BWF World Tour is divided into levels of World Tour Finals, Super 1000, Super 750, Super 500, Super 300 (part of the BWF World Tour), and the BWF Tour Super 100.

Women's singles

BWF Grand Prix (1 title, 2 runners-up) 
The BWF Grand Prix had two levels, the Grand Prix and Grand Prix Gold. It was a series of badminton tournaments sanctioned by the Badminton World Federation (BWF) and played between 2007 and 2017.

Women's singles

  BWF Grand Prix Gold tournament
  BWF Grand Prix tournament

BWF International Challenge/Series (1 runner-up) 
Women's singles

  BWF International Challenge tournament
  BWF International Series tournament

Performance timeline

National team 
 Junior level

 Senior level

Individual competitions

Junior level 
 Girls' singles

 Mixed doubles

Senior level 
 Women's singles

Record against selected opponents 
Record against year-end Finals finalists, World Championships semi-finalists, and Olympic quarter-finalists. Accurate as of 11 December 2022.

References

External links 
 
 

1998 births
Living people
Badminton players from Zhejiang
Sportspeople from Hangzhou
Chinese female badminton players
Badminton players at the 2020 Summer Olympics
Olympic badminton players of China
Olympic gold medalists for China
Olympic medalists in badminton
Medalists at the 2020 Summer Olympics
Badminton players at the 2018 Asian Games
Asian Games silver medalists for China
Asian Games medalists in badminton
Medalists at the 2018 Asian Games
World No. 1 badminton players